Genuphobia (from Latin word genu meaning "knee") is the fear of one's own knees or someone else's knees or the act of kneeling.

Presentation
Some people fear kneeling because it is a form of submission. Symptoms include but are not limited to becoming sick to the stomach, excessive sweating, dry mouth, and anxiety when presented with a situation including knees or kneeling. Sufferers fear the uncomfortable feeling they experience at the sight of knees or they fear the recollection of the injury and the pain associated with it.

Causes
This article has not been verified by an expert and has no citations. 
The phobia could be the result of a negative experience in a person’s life that was associated with knees. The discomfort at the sight of one's knees could be the result of the person’s parents or themselves wearing exclusively clothing that covered the knees growing up, therefore making the person unfamiliar with the sight of them. It could be the result of a traumatic injury that left a scar on the individual’s knee or on someone that they know. The fear of knees can often result in itching of the knees and some might end up chopping or cutting off ones own knees. Sometimes one might go as far as to cut off a loved ones limbs.

Treatment
As with most phobias this fear can be treated with therapy and medication to relieve the feeling of anxiety the person suffers as a result of this phobia.

References

Phobias
Knee